Odontotrochus chlorostomus is a species of sea snail, a marine gastropod mollusk in the family Trochidae, the top snails.

References

poppei
Gastropods described in 1991